Hans Albin Agaton Amelin (25 January 1902 – 8 February 1975) was a Swedish artist.

Biography 
Amelin was born in Chicago in the United States. Amelin began working as a typography student in 1915 and studied at the Konstfack in Stockholm and from 1919 to 1921 and later continued studies in Paris.  He made his debut in 1929 and was one of the founders of Färg och Form art gallery in 1932. He was a politically conscious painter and his motifs are often socially emphasized, often depicting workers. However he painted landscapes as well as still life in expressionist style.

Amelin joined Communist Party of Sweden in 1929. He was the founder of the Association of Independent Artists of Sweden. He headed the society "Art for the people".

In connection with the International Labor Organization's 50th anniversary in 1969, the Swedish Post Office issued a stamp with the motif Arbetarhuvud by Amelin.  He is buried in Bromma cemetery.

References

 

1902 births
1975 deaths
20th-century Swedish painters
Swedish genre painters
Swedish still life painters
Communist Party of Sweden (1924) politicians
Swedish anti-fascists
Swedish communists
Swedish landscape painters
Expressionist painters
People from Chicago